The West Street Chapel is a former  chapel at 24 West Street, London WC2. It was John Wesley’s first Methodist chapel in London's West End.

History
The chapel was built for a Huguenot congregation who has previously worshipped in Newport Market. They took possession of the building in  1700 and  continued to use the chapel until 1743, when John Wesley took out a lease on the building. On Trinity Sunday of that year Wesley recorded in his JournalI began officiating at the chapel in West Street, near the Seven Dials, of which, by a strange chain of providences, we have a lease for seven years. I preached on the Gospel for the day, part of the third chapter of St John; and afterwards administered the Lord's supper to some hundreds of communicants. I was a little afraid at first that my strength would not suffice for the business of the day, when a service of five hours (for it lasted from ten to three) was added to my usual employment. But God looked to that.

He was often assisted at the chapel by George Whitfield, and John William Fletcher  preached his first sermon there in 1751.

From the beginning of the 19th century the chapel  was used for Anglican worship. It is no longer used as a church but Wesley's association with the building is commemorated by a plaque. Its pulpit, used by John and Charles Wesley between 1741 and 1793, is now in the nearby church of St Giles in the Fields.

The former chapel has been listed Grade II on the National Heritage List for England since 1951.

References

Sources

External links

Methodist churches in London
Churches in the London Borough of Camden
1700 establishments in England
Grade II listed buildings in the London Borough of Camden